Phoe Pyonn Cho is a 1955 Burmese black-and-white drama film directed by Mya Maung. The film picked up three Myanmar Motion Picture Academy Awards including Best Film, Best  Actor, Best Child Actor.

Cast
Phoe Par Gyi as Phoe Pyonn Cho
Zeya as Hla Maung
Tin Tin Mu as Mu Mu
Win Mar as A Par, son of Phoe Pyonn Cho
U. Ba Chit as U Ba Chit

Awards

References

1955 films
1955 drama films
Burmese black-and-white films
Burmese drama films